Hans-Jörg Kreowski (born 10 August 1949) is a professor for computer science at the University of Bremen in North West Germany. His primary research area is theoretical computer science with an emphasis on graph transformation, algebraic specification, and syntactic picture processing.

Education and career

Hans-Jörg Kreowski studied mathematics from 1969 to 1974 at the Technical University of Berlin in Germany with a scholarship of Studienstiftung des deutschen Volkes. From 1974 to 1978 he was a research assistant at the computer science department of the Technical University of Berlin where he wrote his doctoral thesis on manipulations of graph transformations and then held an assistant professorship. He obtained his habilitation in 1982 and was appointed professor of theoretical computer science at the University of Bremen in Germany in the same year. There, along with colleagues such as Frieder Nake, Wolfgang Coy, Klaus-Peter Löhr and Hermann Gehring, he significantly shaped the development of the computer science department.

In 1985 Kreowski was a guest researcher at the IBM T.J. Watson Research Center in Yorktown Heights (N.Y, USA). He founded the IFIP Working Group 1.3 (Foundations of Systems Specifications) in 1992 and was its first chairman until 1997. He is also a member of the European Association for Theoretical Computer Science (EATCS), the Gesellschaft für Informatik , and the Forum of Computer Scientists for Peace and Social Responsibility which he chaired from 2003 to 2009. In 1996 he was conferred the Outstanding Service Award by the International Federation of Information Processing and in 2001 he was awarded the IFIP Silver Core. 
Since 2013 Hans Jörg Kreowski is also a member of the Leibniz Scientific Society.

Research

Kreowski has authored over 160 scientific publications with fundamental contributions to the theory and applications of graph transformation, syntactic picture generation, and algebraic specification.
He co-edited over 15 books, among them two handbooks on graph transformation. The edited books span his main research areas and such diverse topics as computer science and society, logistics, and formal methods in software and systems modeling. 
For many years he was the editor for the Educational Matters Column within the Bulletin of the European Association for Theoretical Computer Science.

Selected publications
.
. 
. 
.
.
.
.
.
.
.

References

External links
Kreowski's home page
Forum of Computer Scientists for Peace and Social Responsibility (in German)

1949 births
Living people
German computer scientists
Technical University of Berlin alumni
Academic staff of the University of Bremen